Georgina Ashley Diaz Wilson-Burnand (born 12 February 1986) is a Filipino-British model, actress, host and VJ. In 2015, Wilson hosted the third season of the reality show Asia's Next Top Model.

Early life
Georgina Ashley Diaz Wilson was born on 12 February 1986 in Wichita, Kansas, United States. Her mother is Aurora Diaz, a Filipina, while her father is Robert Wilson, who is of British descent. Through her mother, she is the niece of former Miss Universe Gloria Diaz, and the cousin of her daughter, actress, model and host Isabelle Daza. The eldest among three siblings, Wilson has a younger sister named Jessica, who is also a model, and a younger brother named Samuel. She moved to Bishop Thornton, Yorkshire, England when she was six months old and moved back to the Philippines with her family at age 10.

Wilson attended high school at the Assumption College in Makati and attended college at the Ateneo de Manila University, where she studied for a Bachelor of Science in economics. She later transferred to the University of Sydney in Australia, where she graduated with a Bachelor of Commerce in accounting and became a double major in finance.

Career
Wilson was offered numerous modeling projects since high school. She declined those offers due to the rules of her Catholic high school (Assumption) banning their students from working in modeling, TV and movies. When she graduated, she was cast in a Pond's commercial that aired in mid-2004.  After which, she received more modeling and acting offers. Wilson has endorsed several products and brands in the Philippines since then, such as Bench, Garnier, TechnoMarine, Ginebra San Miguel, Argentina Corned Beef, Fila, Belo Sexy Solutions, Cream Silk, American Apparel, Cadbury, Globe Tattoo, BlackBerry, Wade, SM Accessories, Kashieca, Magnum and Jaguar. Wilson appears in Bench fashion shows every year and has been on several magazine covers. Wilson is also a VJ for Channel V and is the host of Asia's Next Top Model since its third cycle in 2015. Currently, she is also the marketing director of Sunnies Studios, an eyewear brand she co-owns with Bea Soriano, Eric Dee Jr. and Martine Cajucom.

Personal life
By September 2015, Wilson began dating British businessman and hotelier Arthur Burnand. According to Wilson, she and Burnand became engaged in October 2015. The couple married on 30 April 2016 in Winchester, England. In August 2016, Wilson confirmed that she and her husband were expecting their first child. Their first son, Archibald Francis Geoffrey "Archie" Burnand, was born on 14 December 2016.
Their second son, Alfred Thor Crichton "Alfie" Burnand, was born on 24 June 2019. Recently, they welcomed a third child, a daughter named Charlotte Arabella who was born on 5 April 2021.

Television credits

References

External links

1986 births
Living people
Ateneo de Manila University alumni
British female models
Filipino female models
Filipino film actresses
Filipino Roman Catholics
Filipino television actresses
Filipino child actresses
Filipino people of British descent
People from Manila
People from Wichita, Kansas
British VJs (media personalities)
University of Sydney alumni
21st-century Filipino businesspeople